Gymnopilus ludovicianus is a species of mushroom in the family Hymenogastraceae.

See also

List of Gymnopilus species

External links
Gymnopilus ludovicianus at Index Fungorum

ludovicianus
Fungi of North America
Taxa named by William Alphonso Murrill